Murzino is a rural locality (a selo) in Kabansky District, Republic of Buryatia, Russia. The population was 48 as of 2010. There is 1 street.

Geography 
Murzino is located 20 km northwest of Kabansk (the district's administrative centre) by road. Shigayevo is the nearest rural locality.

References 

Rural localities in Kabansky District